Tawfiq al-Yasiri (? –  14 June 2020) was born in Iraq and was an Iraqi military officer and politician.

Biography
He was a brigadier general in the events of 1991 in Iraq, and led opponents of Saddam Hussein's regime in the city of Al Diwaniyah. Al-Yasiri then fled to Saudi Arabia, where he stayed for several years in the Rafha camp and from there to London, where he was active among the opposition within the leadership of the Iraqi National Accord Movement led by former Prime Minister Ayad Allawi. He then later separated from it and then returned to Baghdad after the occupation of Iraq in 2003 and formed a political organization called the "Iraqi National Democratic Coalition" and worked as a consultant in the first Ministry of the Interior after the fall of the regime.

Al-Yasiri died from COVID-19 on 14 June 2020 in Al Diwaniyah, making him the first politician in Iraq to die from the virus during the COVID-19 pandemic in Iraq.

References 

Year of birth missing
2020 deaths
Iraqi generals
Iraqi politicians
Deaths from the COVID-19 pandemic in Iraq